The  is a skyscraper located in Kitakyūshū, Fukuoka Prefecture, Japan. Construction of the  skyscraper was finished in 2008.

References

Buildings and structures completed in 2008
Skyscrapers in Japan
Buildings and structures in Kitakyushu
2008 establishments in Japan